The Devonian Needmore Formation or Needmore Shale is a mapped bedrock unit in Pennsylvania, Maryland, Virginia, and West Virginia.

Description
The Needmore Formation was originally described by Willard and Cleaves in 1939 as a dark- to medium-gray limy shale, based on exposures in southern Fulton County, Pennsylvania.  They considered it part of the Onondaga Group.

DeWitt and Colton (1964) described the Needmore as "soft calcareous medium dark-brownish-gray and greenish-gray shale and mudrock...and soft, slightly calcareous very fissile brownish-black shale" that is not resistant to weathering.  They estimated its thickness in their study area (southern Bedford County, Pennsylvania, and most of Allegany County, Maryland) as approximately 150 feet.

Fossils
DeWitt and Colton (1964) identified brachiopods (Coelospira acutiplicata, Eodevonaria arcuata), trilobites (Phacops cristata), and ostracods (Favulella favulosa) in the Needmore.

Notable Exposures
Type locality is between Needmore and Warfordsburg in southern Fulton County, Pennsylvania.

Age
Relative age dating places the Needmore in the middle Devonian.

References

Geologic formations of Pennsylvania
Geologic formations of Maryland
Geologic formations of Virginia
Geologic formations of West Virginia
Devonian System of North America
Devonian geology of Pennsylvania
Devonian Maryland
Devonian geology of Virginia
Devonian West Virginia
Emsian Stage
Limestone formations of the United States